Athina Dilaveri (born August 25, 1982, in Rethymno, Greece) is a Greek female volleyball player, who played mainly as a libero. She played most notably for Olympiacos, Panathinaikos and AEK Athens in the Greek Women's Volleyball League, winning 1 Greek Championship in 2011 and 1 Greek Cup in 2012. Dilaveri has also a successful career as a beach volley player, having participated in numerous international events.

References

External links
 Athina Dilaveri Koromilia at worldofvolley.com
 

1982 births
Living people
Panathinaikos Women's Volleyball players
Olympiacos Women's Volleyball players
Greek women's volleyball players
Sportspeople from Rethymno
21st-century Greek women